Monde Mahlombe (born 11 November 1985) is a South African cricketer. He played in 30 first-class, 47 List A, and 9 Twenty20 matches from 2005 to 2015.

References

External links
 

1985 births
Living people
South African cricketers
Boland cricketers
Western Province cricketers
Cricketers from Cape Town